Michael, Mick or Mike Robertson may refer to:

Sportsmen
 Michael Robertson (tennis) (born 1963), South African, later American tennis player
 Michael Robertson (discus thrower) (born 1983), American discus thrower
 Michael Robertson (rugby league) (born 1983), Australian rugby league footballer
 Michael Robertson (baseball), American college baseball coach
 Michael Robertson (skier) (born 1982), Australian Olympic skier
 Mike Robertson (baseball) (born 1970), Major League Baseball utility player
 Mike Robertson (snowboarder) (born 1985), Canadian snowboarder

Others
 Michael Robertson (businessman) (born 1967), founder of MP3.com and Lindows.com
 Michael Robertson (filmmaker), Australian film director and producer
 Mick Robertson (born 1946), British children's TV presenter

See also 
 Robertson (surname)